Toby L'Estrange (born September 2, 1988) is an Australian-American former rugby union player who played flyhalf for London Welsh and for the United States Eagles.

L'Estrange was supposed to join the U.S. team for the June 2012 tests, but was unable to join the team at that time due to a broken arm. L'Estrange made his debut for the U.S. on November 9, 2012 against Russia, scoring a try in a 40–26 victory for the U.S.  L'Estrange started all three matches for the U.S. at flyhalf during the November 2013 tests.

In February 2014 he signed with RFU Championship side London Welsh. L'Estrange appeared five times for the Welsh but sustained a fractured leg and was subsequently released at the end of the season.

As of 2021, L’estrange currently teaches at Saint Ignatius' College, Riverview, working in boarding and in the science faculty.

References

1988 births
Living people
American rugby union players
Australian rugby union players
London Welsh RFC players
United States international rugby union players
Rugby union fly-halves